is a Japanese politician of the New Komeito Party, a member of the House of Councillors in the Diet (national legislature). A native of Ena, Gifu and graduate of Soka University, he was elected for the first time in 1992.

References

External links 
 Official website in Japanese.

Members of the House of Councillors (Japan)
Living people
1956 births
New Komeito politicians